Geethanjali is a 1985 Indian Tamil-language film directed by K. Rangaraj. The film stars Murali, Sathyaraj, Bhavya and Nalini. It was released on 12 October 1985.

Plot

Cast 
Murali as James
Sathyaraj as Antony
Nalini as Diana
Bhavya as Julie
Goundamani
Poornam Viswanathan as Church father
Senthil
Kumarimuthu
Karikol Raju

Soundtrack 
The soundtrack was composed by Ilaiyaraaja and lyrics were written by Vaali and Vairamuthu.

Reception
Jayamanmadhan of Kalki called it a typical love triangle story and added the film speaks about caste, Hindu and Christian conflict but without any depth. He concluded the review saying Selvaraj should try something different plot and the makers of Geethanjali should do it.

References

External links 
 

1980s Tamil-language films
1985 films
Films directed by K. Rangaraj
Films scored by Ilaiyaraaja